My Uncle Oswald is a 1979 novel in the sex comedy genre written by Roald Dahl.

The novel stars Uncle Oswald, a character who previously appeared in "The Visitor" and "Bitch", two short stories also written by Roald Dahl (and which can both be found in the 1974 book Switch Bitch).

Plot summary
When Uncle Oswald discovers the sexually invigorating properties of the "Sudanese Blister Beetle"', he devises a plan to steal the semen of great men and sell it to women who want to have children fathered by geniuses.

Victims
Victims of Oswald's plot in order of appearance in the book:

Alfonso XIII, King of Spain
Pierre-Auguste Renoir, French painter
Claude Monet, French painter
Igor Stravinsky, Russian composer
Pablo Picasso, Spanish painter. In fact, Uncle Oswald and his accomplice are unsuccessful here: Picasso pounces on the accomplice before she has a chance to use a condom to collect his semen. 
Henri Matisse, French artist
Marcel Proust, French novelist
Vaslav Nijinsky, Polish-born Russian ballet dancer and choreographer
James Joyce, expatriate Irish writer and poet
Giacomo Puccini, Italian operatic composer
Sergei Rachmaninoff, Russian composer, conductor and pianist
Sigmund Freud, Austrian neurologist and founder of psychoanalysis
Albert Einstein, German-born theoretical physicist
Thomas Mann, German novelist
Joseph Conrad, Polish-born British novelist
H. G. Wells, British writer
Rudyard Kipling, Indian-born British author and poet
Sir Arthur Conan Doyle, British writer and creator of Sherlock Holmes
George Bernard Shaw, Irish playwright
Albert I of Belgium
Victor Emmanuel III of Italy
Peter I of Serbia
George II of Greece
Boris III of Bulgaria
Ferdinand of Romania
Christian X of Denmark
Gustaf V of Sweden

Reception
In his 1980 review, Vance Bourjaily said: 

Christopher Lehmann-Haupt called it "a festival of bad taste that is at heart so innocent that we soon forgive it and enjoy ourselves," "thoroughly juvenile fun," and said "I haven't had so much fun of this sort since my last all-night joke-telling session at summer camp."

Movieweb named it as one of 8 Roald Dahl books that need a screen adaptation.

References

External links

Novels by Roald Dahl
1979 British novels
Cultural depictions of Pablo Picasso
Cultural depictions of Albert Einstein
Cultural depictions of Sigmund Freud
Cultural depictions of George Bernard Shaw
Cultural depictions of Arthur Conan Doyle
Cultural depictions of Marcel Proust
Cultural depictions of Claude Monet
Cultural depictions of Pierre-Auguste Renoir
Cultural depictions of Igor Stravinsky
Cultural depictions of H. G. Wells
Cultural depictions of Henri Matisse
Fiction set in the 1920s
Michael Joseph books